Indian Creek Wilderness Study Area is a wilderness study area managed by the United States Bureau of Land Management in southern Utah.  It encompasses  of land immediately east of the Needles district of Canyonlands National Park in the rugged lower stretches of Indian Creek near where it flows into the Colorado River.

References

Protected areas of San Juan County, Utah